Smith and Dimon Shipyard or just Smith & Dimon was a renowned shipyard on the east side of Manhattan during the 1840s.

History

The shipyard was located along the East River between 4th and 5th Street. It was founded by partners Stephen Smith (1794–1875) and John Dimon (1795–1879). Dimon was in charge of the more profitable ship repair business and described the partnership saying, "Smith builds the ships, I make the money." John W. Griffiths was a famed naval architect who designed revolutionary, fast clipper ships for Smith & Dimon. The shipyard became famous for its work in the 1840s under the name Smith & Dimon. It was formerly Blossom, Smith and Dimon in the 1820s and then Smith, Dimon and Comstock in the 1830s.

In addition to clipper ships, the shipyard also built steamships, including the 1848 steamship Oregon.

James Pringle painted the shipyard in 1833. The painting is on display at the Fenimore Art Museum.

Ships built at Smith & Dimon 

Liberator, 1826. (Later named Hudson)
Mary Howland, 500 ton, noted for its size.
Roscoe, Packet boat
Independence, 1834 Packet boat
Rainbow, 1845. Said to be the first extreme clipper.
Sea Witch, 1846, a model for American fast clippers.
Oregon, 1848
Memnon, 1848
 Arago, 1855
Fulton, 1855

References

External links 
 "The Smith and Dimon Shipyard on the East River, New York," by James Pringle, 1833 at the Library of Congress.

 

American shipbuilders
Defunct companies based in New York City
Maritime history of the United States
Shipyards of New York (state)